Kabudan (also Romanized as Kabūdān) is a village in Kuhpayeh Rural District Rural District, in the Central District of Bardaskan County, Razavi Khorasan Province, Iran. At the 2006 census, its population was 841, in 292 families.

References 

Populated places in Bardaskan County